Disney Fam Jam is an American dance competition television series that aired on Disney Channel from February 23 to December 4, 2020. The series is hosted by Phil Wright, Ariel Martin, and Trevor Tordjman.

Premise 
Two families dance against each other. Phil Wright helps the families with the choreography while Ariel Martin and Trevor Tordjman host the main event. After their performances, the audience votes for their favorite families. The family with the most votes receives a grand prize of $10,000 and the Fam Jam trophy, while the runner-up family receives $2,500.

Production 
On October 11, 2019, it was announced that Disney Channel had given a straight-to-series order to Disney Fam Jam, inspired by Phil Wright's online The Parent Jam dance classes. Production on the multi-camera series began in November 2019. Matador Content serves as production company. Jay Peterson, Todd Lubin, Irene Dreayer, and Phil Wright serve as executive producers. James Sunderland serves as showrunner. On January 17, 2020, it was announced that the series would premiere on February 23, 2020. Ariel Martin, Trevor Tordjman, and Phil Wright serve as hosts for the series.

Episodes

Ratings 
 
}}

References

External links 
 

2020s American reality television series
2020 American television series debuts
2020 American television series endings
Dance competition television shows
Disney Channel original programming